Duffield Gate railway station was a station on the Selby to Driffield Line in North Yorkshire, England serving the hamlet of South Duffield. It opened on 1 August 1848 as Duffield and closed in August 1870. It was then re-opened as Duffield Gate in May 1871 and closed 1 May 1890.

References

External links
 

Disused railway stations in North Yorkshire
Railway stations in Great Britain opened in 1848
Railway stations in Great Britain closed in 1870
Railway stations in Great Britain opened in 1871
Railway stations in Great Britain closed in 1890
Former York and North Midland Railway stations